Mark Hilton may refer to:

Mark K. Hilton (born 1966), North Carolina politician
Mark Hilton (Australian footballer) (born 1979), played for North Melbourne
Mark Hilton (English footballer) (born 1968), English football midfielder
Mark Hilton (rugby league) (born 1975), English rugby league footballer
Mark Hilton (tennis) (born 1981), British tennis player

See also
Mark Hylton (disambiguation)
Marcus Hilton, dancer